The Campeonato Capixaba is the football league of the Brazilian state of Espírito Santo.

History
From 1917 to 1929, it was disputed the Campeonato da Cidade de Vitória (Vitória City Championship), a competition contested only by Vitória city clubs. In 1930, this competition was replaced by the current competition, the Campeonato Capixaba, which is disputed by clubs from the Espírito Santo state.

Format

As in any other Brazilian football championship, the format can change every year.

Clubs
First Division 2022
 Associação Desportiva Ferroviária Vale do Rio Doce
 Centro de Treinamento Edmílson Colatina Futebol Clube (CTE Colatina)
 Estrela do Norte Futebol Clube
 Nova Venécia Futebol Clube
 Real Noroeste Capixaba Futebol Clube
 Rio Branco Atlético Clube (Vitória)
 Rio Branco Futebol Clube (Venda Nova)
 Sociedade Desportiva Serra Futebol Clube
 Vilavelhense Futebol Clube
 Vitória Futebol Clube

List of champions

Campeonato da Cidade de Vitória (Vitória City Championship)

Campeonato Capixaba

Notes

Linhares EC went bankrupt in 1998, giving way to Linhares FC which has a similar badge (based on the city's coat of arms), however the two clubs have no institutional link.

Titles by team

Teams in bold still active.

By city

References

External links
FES Official Website
RSSSF
Copa Espírito Santo at RSSSF

 
Football competitions in Espírito Santo
Capixaba